The Knights of Egypt Party is a political party in Egypt founded by former members of the Egyptian military. The party is running in the 2015 Egyptian parliamentary election.

References

External links
Knights of Egypt website

2013 establishments in Egypt
Political parties established in 2013
Liberal parties in Egypt